SK Sugar Gliders is a South Korean women's handball club based in Gwangmyeong. The club was established in 2012.

Honours 
Handball Korea League
Winners: 2017, 2019–20
Runners-up: 2018–19

References 

Sugar Gliders
South Korean handball clubs
Sport in Seoul
Handball clubs established in 2012
2012 establishments in South Korea